The Maligne River is a medium-sized river in the Canadian Rockies. It runs through parts of Jasper National Park in Alberta, Canada. The Maligne is a major tributary of the Athabasca River. The river takes from the French word for malignant or wicked. It is theorised that a Belgian priest (Pieter Jan De Smet )  voyageur created this name in reference to the current of the river near its confluence with the Athabasca River.

Geography
The Maligne River begins south of Maligne Lake. Forming from the meltwater of Replica Peak, the river heads north, passing under Mount Mary Vaux, Lysfran Peak, Mount Unwin, and Mount Charleton before emptying into Maligne Lake. The Maligne River drains the north end of Maligne Lake and heads northwest to Medicine Lake. It then flows west, entering the Athabasca River. Below Maligne Lake, it is a losing stream; its flow mostly disappears underground at Medicine Lake, only to reappear downstream in Maligne Canyon.

Gallery

See also
List of Alberta rivers

References

External links

Rivers of Alberta